Nordstromia is a genus of moths belonging to the subfamily Drepaninae.

Species
Nordstromia agna (Oberthür, 1916)
Nordstromia angula H.F. Chu & L.Y. Wang, 1988
Nordstromia argenticeps (Warren, 1922)
Nordstromia bicostata (Hampson, 1912)
Nordstromia coffeata Inoue, 1992
Nordstromia duplicata (Warren, 1922)
Nordstromia fusca H.F. Chu & L.Y. Wang, 1988
Nordstromia fuscula H.F. Chu & L.Y. Wang, 1988
Nordstromia grisearia (Staudinger, 1892)
Nordstromia guenterriedeli Buchsbaum, 2010
Nordstromia heba H.F. Chu & L.Y. Wang, 1988
Nordstromia humerata (Warren, 1896)
Nordstromia japonica (Moore, 1877)
Nordstromia lilacina (Moore, 1888)
Nordstromia nigra H.F. Chu & L.Y. Wang, 1988
Nordstromia niva H.F. Chu & L.Y. Wang, 1988
Nordstromia ochrozona (Bryk, 1943)
Nordstromia paralilacina M. Wang & Yazaki, 2004
Nordstromia problematica (Bryk, 1943)
Nordstromia recava (Watson, 1968)
Nordstromia siccifolia (Roepke, 1948)
Nordstromia semililacina Inoue, 1992
Nordstromia simillima (Moore, 1888)
Nordstromia sumatrana (Roepke, 1948)
Nordstromia undata (Watson, 1968)
Nordstromia unilinea H.F. Chu & L.Y. Wang, 1988
Nordstromia vira (Moore, [1866])

Former species
Nordstromia amabilis Bryk, 1942

References

 , 2010: Nordstromia guenterriedeli sp. n. from Sumatra (Indonesia) (Lepidoptera: Drepanidae). Entomofauna 0031: 57–68.
 , 1988: On the Chinese Drepaninae (Lepidoptera: Drepanidae) genus Nordstroemia Bryk, 1943. Acta Entomologica Sinica 31 (3): 309–317.
 , 2004: A new species of Nordstromia Bryk (Drepanidae: Drepaninae) from S. China. Tinea 18 (2): 140–142.

Drepaninae
Drepanidae genera